On 8 September 2011 Nuon announced the pilot plant would be closed down since no investor for production expansion could be found. However, on 7 May 2012 Nuon announced that Helianthos has been sold to HyET Solar.

Process technology
The process uses a temporary substrate on which flexible thin-film solar cells are deposited. The use of the temporary substrate allows relatively high processing temperatures while using (semi-)continuous roll-to-roll (or reel-to-reel) production processes and cost-efficient, abundantly available materials.

The active layers of such solar cells comprise a transparent conductive oxide layer (TCO), an active absorbent layer (e.g. thin-film silicon), and a back contact layer (e.g. a reflective metal layer).

Process sequence
The key steps in the process sequence are:
 Deposit the TCO layer on a temporary metal substrate foil using chemical vapor deposition (CVD) at about 500 °C (932 °F) .
 Deposit the active absorber layer (e.g. thin film silicon layer) using plasma enhanced CVD
 Deposit the reflective back contact by means of physical vapor deposition
 Pattern for monolithic interconnection
 Laminate to a permanent carrier foil
 Remove the temporary substrate foil by means of wet etching
 Confectioning, contact application and encapsulation

Applications
Using this process, flexible photovoltaic (PV) laminates are fabricated that can substantially reduce the per-kilowatt hour costs of solar electricity. Further, the resulting photovoltaic laminates are lightweight, rugged and offer certain freedoms of design.

PV laminates have the potential to be used for a range of applications, including:
 Large area roofing and other large area applications to generate electricity
 Rural electrification
 Industrial applications
 Portable applications.

Sources
 Nuon Helianthos

See also
 Solar cell
 Thin-film cells
 Nuon

References
 Challenges in the development of thin-film silicon PV by Bernd Stannowski
 presentation Advanced Thin-Film Silicon Solar Cells
 World Record for thin film solar cells of Nuon Helianthos
 IKEA gets current from the roof
 Nuon Press Statement about the closing down of the pilot plant

Energy conversion
Thin-film cells